Elva Trill is an Irish actress and singer. She is known for Line of Duty (2012) and Starstruck (2021). She is also one of the vocalists of the "indie four piece" band The City and Us.

Early life
Trill was born in County Sligo, and grew up in the town of Ballymote. She knew from a young age she wanted to be an actress and, at the age of 12, took part in Saturday sessions at the Gaiety School of Acting.

Career
In her late teens Trill got a place in The Factory rehearsal studios and landed a role on the BBC series Ripper Street, which was being filmed in Dublin.

In addition to appearing in the television drama series Red Rock, she had a part in the horror film Cherry Tree (2015) and Brother (2015) which was filmed in Belgium and Ireland. This included scenes filmed, in late 2015, at the Hellfire Club on Montpelier Hill, County Dublin.

She later secured roles in a number of other productions such as The Hallmark Channel's Royal Matchmaker (2018), Soulsmith (2017), and in Stephen Burke's feature film Maze (2017).

She subsequently landed roles in the TV series Starstruck (2021), The Ghosts of Monday (2021), and Jurassic World Dominion (2022).

Filmography

References

External links

1992 births
1993 births
Living people
Irish film actresses
21st-century Irish actresses